Martin Doyle may refer to:
 Martin Doyle (ecologist) (born 1973), American ecologist
 Martin Doyle (VC) (1891–1940), Irish member of the British Army and recipient of the Victoria Cross
 Martin Doyle (wrestler) (born 1958), Irish Olympic wrestler
 William Hickey (writer) (1787–1875), also known as Martin Doyle, Irish writer and philanthropist